Underrated may refer to:

 Underrated, a 2019 album by Papoose
 Underrated, a 2014 mixtape by Xcelencia
 Underrated, an unreleased album by Bow Wow
 Chapter V: Underrated, a 2011 album by Syleena Johnson
 Underrated, a member of hip hop group Potluck
 Underrated, a 2020 digital tv series by Mandalay Sports Media

See also 
 Under Rated & Never Faded, comedy special by Mike Epps